The fifth season of the Seven Network television series A Place to Call Home premiered on Showcase on 8 October 2017. The series was produced by Chris Martin-Jones, and executive produced by Penny Win and Julie McGauran.

Production 
On 16 November 2016, Foxtel announced that A Place to Call Home had been renewed for a fifth season. Of the renewal, Foxtel CEO, Peter Tonagh stated "[The show] goes way beyond just being a piece of content that appears on the screen. It’s a passion for hundreds of thousands of people who watch it every week."

Production on the fifth season began in February 2017.

Of the show's return, Foxtel's Head of Drama, Penny Win stated, "A Place to Call Home has continued to build very strong audiences and passionate fans throughout its time on Foxtel. We are thrilled with the success of the series both here and around the world, and series five promises to be more of what our audience loves. The incredible cast, whose performances are exemplary, and the creative team, led by Julie McGauran and Chris Martin-Jones, have brought Foxtel a wonderful piece of dramatic television that we are all very proud of." Seven's Head of Drama, Julie McGauran stated, "All of us at Seven Productions are delighted to continue the hugely successful collaboration with Foxtel on A Place To Call Home. This series is testament to how great storytelling, the talents of a truly gifted cast and a superb production can align to create extraordinary television and Seven are proud to be a part of an industry here in Australia that continues to deliver world class drama."

Plot 
Season five jumps forward four years to 1958 and looks at the changes in Australian society during that period, as cultural norms fall away, morals change, and the younger generation rejects the values of their elders and the continued focus on the War years. Ash Park faces turmoil as old friendships and rivalries reverse themselves, raising the question of what home means.

Cast

Main
 Marta Dusseldorp as Sarah Nordmann
 Noni Hazelhurst as Elizabeth Goddard
 Brett Climo as George Bligh
 Craig Hall as Dr. Jack Duncan
 David Berry as James Bligh
 Abby Earl as Anna Bligh
 Arianwen Parkes-Lockwood as Olivia Bligh
 Sara Wiseman as Carolyn Duncan
 Jenni Baird as Regina Bligh
 Tim Draxl as Dr. Henry Fox
 Deborah Kennedy as Doris Collins
 Frankie J. Holden as Roy Briggs

Recurring & Guest
 Elliot Domoney as David Bligh
 Martin Sacks as Isaac Gold
 Madeleine Clunies-Ross as Leah Gold
 Heather Mitchell as Prudence Swanson
 Mark Lee as Sir Richard Bennett
 Robert Coleby as Douglas Goddard
Conrad Coleby as Matthew Goddard
 Clodagh Crowe as Dawn Briggs
 George Pullar as Larry Forbes
 Aaron Pedersen as Frank Gibbs
 Matt Day as Ed Jarvis

Notes

Episodes

Ratings

References

External links 
 
 

2017 Australian television seasons